Taeke Wiebe Doekes Taekema (born 14 January 1980) is a Dutch field hockey player and drag flicker (penalty corner specialist) who won the silver medal with the national squad at the 2004 Summer Olympics in Athens. Born in Leiderdorp, he made his debut on 28 January 2000 in a friendly match in and against Egypt and has played in over two hundred international matches for the Dutch.

During the 2007 Men's EuroHockey Nations Championship, Taekema struck a record 16 goals, including a double hat trick against Belgium in the semi-finals. Sportswear maker Adidas introduced its limited edition TT10 hockey stick, which incorporated Taekema's initials and jersey number.

He was the top scorer in the 2010 Men's Hockey World Cup held in New Delhi with 8 goals along with Luke Doerner.

External links
 
 Profile

1980 births
Living people
Dutch male field hockey players
Male field hockey defenders
Male field hockey midfielders
Olympic field hockey players of the Netherlands
Olympic silver medalists for the Netherlands
2002 Men's Hockey World Cup players
Field hockey players at the 2004 Summer Olympics
2006 Men's Hockey World Cup players
Field hockey players at the 2008 Summer Olympics
2010 Men's Hockey World Cup players
People from Leiderdorp
Olympic medalists in field hockey
Medalists at the 2004 Summer Olympics
Amsterdamsche Hockey & Bandy Club players
HC Klein Zwitserland players
Hockey India League players
Sportspeople from South Holland